Dr. Mehrdad Nikoonahad is an Iranian-American electrical engineer, technologist, innovator and entrepreneur.

Background and education

He received his B.Sc. and Ph.D. degrees in Electronic Engineering from University College London (UCL), England, in 1979 and 1983, respectively. Here, he also completed two years of postdoctoral work. His Ph.D. and postdoctoral work were concerned with acoustic imaging and microscopy and were carried out under the supervision of Sir Eric Ash.  He became a Senior Member of the IEEE by nomination in 1989.  In 1997 he completed the Executive Program for Growing Companies at the Graduate School of Business of Stanford University.

Career and business interests

He was former Founder and CEO at Partoe Inc., a privately held company located in Menlo Park, California and focused on distributed power electronics for photovoltaic(PV) solar markets. Prior to this he was Co-founder and CEO at Solar Notion, Inc., a privately held company in Silicon Valley, set out to achieve grid parity for PV electricity through a radically new silicon process technology.

Dr. Nikoonahad was involved with a number of start-up, private, and public companies at the executive level, all in the high technology arena. He was formerly Vice President of Technology for Strategic Business Development at KLA-Tencor (KT) Corporation. He joined Tencor Instruments in Mountain View, California in 1992 when he proposed and helped develop a platform for a high-speed, laser-based, wafer inspection system, which, then for the first time, addressed the inspection needs for 0.25 micrometre semiconductor device fabrication technology during high volume production.  That platform was subsequently named Advanced Inspection Technology (AIT)and helped the chip fabrication industry in a significant way. He then managed development groups and extended that capability for smaller silicon geometries, using ultraviolet lasers. Subsequent to the AIT, he led numerous development teams for inspection and metrology products used in silicon manufacturing.  Laser imaging, metals and dielectric thin film metrology, laser and spectral ellipsometry for dielectric film characterization, photothermal ellipsometry for implant measurement, chemical-mechanical planarization (CMP) end-point detection, optical CD (OCD), overlay characterization, and micro/macro defect inspection are among some the technologies that Dr. Nikoonahad and his teams have developed. He was Vice President of Technology for a new division of KT focused on integrated meteorology. He was also held an advisory role for the KT Venture Fund and was a member of the corporate Patent Review Committee. He was the winner of numerous innovation and patent awards while at KT.

Prior to KT he was at Philips research labs in Briarcliff Manor, New York where he served as Senior Member Technical Staff and led research on acoustic imaging, and medical ultrasound. Dr. Nikoonahad has been principal investigator on a number R&D projects for the US National Aeronautics and Space Administration (NASA) and the National Institutes of Health (NIH).

He has authored or coauthored over 50 scientific papers, including a book chapter and is a named inventor on over 100 US patents and patent applications.

In 2019 he was invited as visiting professor at the Department of Economics and Management of University of Trento, Italy where he was involved with teaching entrepreneurship at the Start-up Lab (an initiative offered by Clab Trento), a renowned international program selecting startup projects that have potential to scale worldwide. The program itself has been designed taking inspiration from the format inaugurated by Y Combinator.

References

American chief executives of energy companies
Nikooonahad, Mehrdad
Nikooonahad, Mehrdad
Nikooonahad, Mehrdad
Nikooonahad, Mehrdad
Nikooonahad, Mehrdad
Nikooonahad, Mehrdad
Year of birth missing (living people)